Maria Grazia Chiuri (born February 2, 1964) is an Italian fashion designer. After stints working at Fendi and Valentino, Chiuri was named creative director at Dior.

Biography
Her maternal grandfather died during the Second World War, leaving her grandmother to raise their five children alone. Her mother joined a sewing workshop at a young age before opening her own boutique in Rome, but pushed her daughter, Maria Grazia Chiuri, to study.

Her father was in the military and her mother was a dressmaker, she had five sisters. She has cited her grandmother, mother and sisters as an inspiration. She studied at IED, Istituto Europeo di Design in Rome, then started at Fendi where she designed handbag lines.

Maria Grazia Chiuri joined Fendi in 1989. While at Fendi, she helped develop the famous Baguette bag and recruited the designer Pierpaolo Piccioli to join the department.

In 1999, she joined the Italian fashion house Valentino, where she was responsible for the accessories lines. Already, she was approached by the House of Dior to be in charge of the handbag line; too restrictive a proposal, which she refused. In 2008, when Valentino Garavani retired, she was promoted within the Italian company to co-Artistic Director of the brand, alongside Pier Paolo Piccioli, whom she had known since her studies at the Istituto Europeo di Design. Her beginnings were difficult but she knew how to make the Roman brand evolve in a few years. Her collections are characterized by an "Italian style, romantic and precious". Later in 2003 the pair also began to manage creative direction for the Red Valentino diffusion collection. Chiuri and Piccioli were named co-creative directors of Valentino in 2008 overseeing full artistic direction for the brand including Womenswear, Menswear & Haute Couture, and both were awarded the CFDA International Award for their work in 2015.

In 2016, she was appointed, by Sidney Toledano, artistic director of the women's collections of Christian Dior (haute couture and ready-to-wear, six collections per year). Succeeding Raf Simons, she becomes the first woman to hold this position since the creation of the brand in 1946. Her first shows for the French house are characterized by its minimalism and feminist claims.

On July 6, 2020, Maria Grazia Chiuri presents the Haute Couture Autumn-Winter 2020-2021 collection. Due to the health crisis, this one is presented for the first time in the form of a film, in collaboration with Matteo Garrone, an Italian film director. They will also collaborate on the film of the Haute Couture Spring-Summer 2021 collection.

Chiuri's work is often described as youthful, and she cites her daughter Rachele Regini as a muse.

Beginnings at Dior 

In July 2016 Chiuri was appointed the creative director of Dior. Vanessa Freidman of The New York Times reported "She will be the first woman to lead the creative side in the label’s 69-year history, and the role will be her first solo appointment after more than two decades of working with Pierpaolo Piccioli, who has been named creative director at Valentino."  The Irish Times remarked "As artistic director of the storied Paris fashion house, Ms Chiuri will follow in the footsteps of designers like Yves Saint Laurent, Gianfranco Ferre and John Galliano."

In September 2016 Chiuri debuted her first collection for Christian Dior SE in Paris. The show featured many feminist references including a T-shirt bearing the title of Chimamanda Ngozi Adichie's essay We Should All Be Feminists. Chiuri would continue this theme in subsequent shows including a reference to Linda Nochlin's essay Why Have There Been No Great Women Artists? for SS18 as well as a collaboration with artist Judy Chicago and The Chanakya School of Craft for the set of her SS20 Haute Couture collection at Dior. According to Chiuri “The new generation has raised big questions about gender, race, environment and cultures that we have to reflect in fashion,”.

Feminist designs 

Maria Grazia Chiuri has often been inspired by feminism for the clothes she has created for Dior. In addition, she regularly invites committed artists to present her collections.

 March 2020: Quotes from Carla Lonzi's manifesto are displayed during the presentation of the 1970s-inspired collection, such as "The patriarchy kills love" or "We are all clitoridian women".
 February 2020: At the 92nd Academy Awards, Natalie Portman chose to wear a Dior cape that Maria Grazia Chiuri custom-made. Over it was embroidered the name of each of the directors who have marked the history of cinema in recent months. Thus, the names of some directors were visible: Lorene Scafaria (for the film Queens with Jennifer Lopez), Greta Gerwig (The Daughters of Dr. March), Lulu Wang (Farewell) or Marielle Heller (An extraordinary friend).
 January 2020: During a very stylized Dior fashion show, staged in the garden of the Rodin Museum, the catwalk was lined with 21 banners, on which were embroidered feminist phrases, such as "Could men and women be equal? "
 September 2016: The slogan "We should all be feminist," a cult phrase uttered by Nigerian author and feminist icon Chimamanda Ngozi Adichie, found itself printed on white t-shirts of two models at the Dior show at Paris Fashion Week for the Spring 2017 collection.

Publications 

In 2021, Maria Grazia Chiuri published the book Her Dior: Maria Grazia Chiuri's New Voice. It features the work of 33 photographers who have worked with Maria Grazia Chiuri and Dior. The book illustrates the work of these artists who represent an important part of contemporary photography and celebrates the innovative and feminist spirit of Maria Grazia Chiuri.

Maria Grazia Chiuri is, along with Pierpaolo Piccioli, author of the book Valentino: Objects of Couture, published on November 5, 2013. This book presents the legacy of accessory design by the legendary Valentino fashion house.

Awards and distinctions 

 Monday, July 1, 2019: Maria Grazia Chiuri is decorated with the insignia of Knight of the National Order of the Legion of Honor from the hands of Marlene Schiappa, Secretary of State for Equality between Men and Women. The award was received after the Dior Haute Couture Autumn-Winter 2019-2020 fashion show. The award was given to honor the values and feminist message that Maria Grazia Chiuri conveys through her collections for the house of Dior and her collaborations with female artists.

 2017: Maria Grazia Chiuri receives the "Glamour Award for Designer of the Year," as well as the "Glamour Award for The Fashion Force," presented by Glamour magazine.

 2015: Maria Grazia Chiuri receives the CFDA (Council of Fashion Designers of America) award for her creations at Valentino.

Personal life
She married Paolo Regini, a shirtmaker, and has a son Niccolò and a daughter Rachele.

References

External links
 Maria Grazia Chiuri & Pierpaolo Piccioli's Live Mosaic
 The Emperor's New Clothes
 Creative direction 

1964 births
Living people
Fashion designers from Rome
Dior people
Creative directors
Italian fashion designers
Italian women fashion designers